Trichoplusia is a genus of moths of the family Noctuidae.

Species
 Trichoplusia arachnoides Distant, 1901
 Trichoplusia aranea Hampson, 1909
 Trichoplusia callista Dufay, 1972
 Trichoplusia cinnabarina Dufay, 1972
 Trichoplusia cupreomicans Hampson, 1909
 Trichoplusia elacheia Dufay, 1972
 Trichoplusia epicharis Dufay, 1972
 Trichoplusia glyceia Dufay, 1972
 Trichoplusia gromieri Dufay, 1975
 Trichoplusia lectula (Walker, 1858)
 Trichoplusia lampra Dufay, 1968
 Trichoplusia ni – Cabbage Looper (Hübner, [1803])
 Trichoplusia obtusisigna Walker, 1858
 Trichoplusia orichalcea (Fabricius, 1775)
 Trichoplusia photeina Dufay, 1972
 Trichoplusia roseofasciata Carcasson, 1965
 Trichoplusia sestertia Felder, 1874
 Trichoplusia sogai Dufay, 1968
 Trichoplusia telaugea Dufay, 1972
 Trichoplusia tetrastigma Hampson, 1910

References
 Natural History Museum Lepidoptera genus database
 Trichoplusia at funet.fi

 
Plusiinae
Moth genera